The Ice Hockey European Championship was an annual ice hockey tournament for European countries associated with the International Ice Hockey Federation. A total of 66 European Champions were crowned in between the years 1910 and 1991.

Independent championship tournaments were organized between 1910 and 1927, and again in 1929 and 1932. The 1928 European Championships medals were awarded to the European participants of the Olympic tournament in St. Moritz. After 1932, the European Championship was awarded to the top European team among the participants in the Ice Hockey World Championships. Until 1970, the final standings for the European Championship was determined simply by where European teams placed in the World Championships. Starting in 1971, a separate final standings was maintained, determined by using only the games played between European teams at the World Championships.

Between 1954 and 1991, in all but five tournaments, the only three teams to medal were the Soviets, Czechoslovakia, and Sweden. The Soviets led all European countries with 27 championships in that span.

There were no European (or World) Championships awarded in the Olympic years 1980, 1984, and 1988.

Results

European Medalists from combined events

Medal table

See also
 Euro Hockey Tour
 IIHF European Women Championships

References

 

 
European championships
International Ice Hockey Federation tournaments
European championships
Defunct ice hockey competitions in Europe
Recurring sporting events established in 1910
Recurring sporting events disestablished in 1991